The EMMA – Espoo Museum of Modern Art, is a major art museum in Espoo in southern Finland. After the founding of Espoo Art Museum Foundation in September 2002, EMMA opened its doors for visitors in 2006. With its 5000 square metre exhibition space, it is the largest museum in the whole of Finland. The permanent exhibition presents a selection from The Saastamoinen Foundation Art Collection and the other half the changing domestic and international exhibitions.

It is housed in the WeeGee house, a building complex which contains five museums, a modern art gallery, a media-art centre, a café, a museum shop and an art school. The centre was named after the printing firm Weilin+Göös.

See also
Kiasma
Michael Jackson: On the Wall

References

External links
EMMA homepage in English
EMMA – Espoo Museum of Modern Art within Google Arts & Culture

Contemporary art galleries in Finland
Modern art museums
Buildings and structures in Espoo
Art museums established in 2006
2006 establishments in Finland
Art museums and galleries in Finland
Museums in Uusimaa
Tapiola